Jennifer Shahade (born December 31, 1980) is an American chess player, poker player, commentator and writer. She is a two-time United States Women's Champion and has the FIDE title of Woman Grandmaster. Shahade is the author of the books Chess Bitch, Play Like a Girl, and most recently, Chess Queens, and co-author of Marcel Duchamp: The Art of Chess. She is the Women's Program Director at US Chess, MindSports Ambassador for PokerStars and a board member of the World Chess Hall of Fame in Saint Louis.

Early life 
Shahade was born in Philadelphia, Pennsylvania. She is the daughter of FIDE Master Mike Shahade and Drexel University chemistry professor and author Sally Solomon. Her father is Christian Lebanese and her mother is Jewish. Her older brother, Greg Shahade, is an International Master. She attended Julia R. Masterman School.

Career 
In 1998, she became the first female winner of the U.S. Junior Open.

In 2002, she won the U.S. Women's Chess Championship in Seattle, Washington. At the next U.S. Women's Championship she earned her second International Master norm, and in 2004, she won her 2nd U.S. Women's Chess Championship.

Shahade lives in Philadelphia and has earned a degree in comparative literature at New York University. Her writing has appeared in the LA Times, The New York Times, Chess Life, New In Chess, and Games Magazine. Her first book, Chess Bitch: Women in the Ultimate Intellectual Sport (Siles Press) was published in October 2005.

Shahade is the former web editor-in-chief of the United States Chess Federation website.

In 2007 Shahade co-founded a chess non-profit called 9 Queens.

Shahade is also a poker player. In 2014, she became the MindSports Ambassador for PokerStars. On December 9, 2014, Shahade won the first TonyBet Open Face Chinese Poker Live World Championship High Roller Event taking home €100,000. She is also a former coach for the training website Run It Once.

Shahade is the host of the poker podcast the GRID, which she produces with her husband Daniel Meirom. In 2019, the GRID won the Global Poker Award for Podcast of the Year. She also hosts a monthly chess podcast Ladies Knight, produced by the U.S. Chess Federation.

Shahade is a board member of the World Chess Hall of Fame. Since 2018 Shahade has been the woman's program director at the U.S. Chess Federation, which brings chess programming to thousands of girls in the country.

Personal life 

Shahde is married to Daniel Meirom. In 2019, they created "Not Particularly Beautiful," an art installation that overlaid misogynist insults directed at women in chess over the squares of a chessboard.

In February 2023, Shahade accused GM Alejandro Ramírez of sexually assaulting her twice, and stated that she had heard from other alleged victims. The United States Chess Federation and 
Saint Louis Chess Club are currently investigating Ramírez over the alleged sexual misconduct. On March 6, Ramírez resigned his affiliation with the Saint Louis Chess Club and the Saint Louis University chess team. The following day, The Wall Street Journal published an article corroborating Shahade's claims, finding based on interviews with eight women, that Ramírez had made unwelcome sexual advances towards them since 2011 and that the alleged behavior was an open secret.

Works and publications

References

External links

1980 births
Living people
American chess writers
American female chess players
American non-fiction writers
American people of Lebanese descent
Chess woman grandmasters
American women non-fiction writers
Jewish American sportspeople
Jewish chess players
American poker players
Female poker players
Sportspeople from Philadelphia
21st-century American Jews
Sportspeople of Lebanese descent
21st-century American women